Indotyphis is an extinct genus of sea snails, marine gastropod mollusks, in the family Muricidae, the murex snails or rock snails.

It is considered a synonym of † Laevityphis (Indotyphis) Keen, 1944. Its status is uncertain, as it has not been researched in recent literature.

Species

References

 
Gastropods described in 1944